Huffman House, also known as Creekside Farm and Huffman Farm, is a historic home and farm located east of Newport in Craig County, Virginia. The farmhouse was built about 1835, with an addition and remodeling between 1907 and 1911. It is a two-story, single-pile center-hall plan, frame dwelling with a side gable roof. Also on the property are a contributing early-19th century barn, a corn crib, a wash house, a garage, and an early-20th century country store. The property is an example of a small town center located along the Cumberland Gap Turnpike; a major transportation route of the 18th, 19th, and 20th centuries.  The country store also held the local post office for a few years, provided sleeping quarters to travelers along the turnpike, and has served as a local Baptismal hole. The farmhouse also doubled as a lodge to weary travelers.

It was listed on the National Register of Historic Places in 2005.

References

Houses on the National Register of Historic Places in Virginia
Farms on the National Register of Historic Places in Virginia
Houses completed in 1835
Houses in Craig County, Virginia
National Register of Historic Places in Craig County, Virginia